Chen Wangdao (1891–1977) was a Chinese scholar and educator. He is recognized as the first and only person to translate the Communist Manifesto into Chinese completely so far. He also served as president of Fudan University from 1949 to 1977.

Chen was born Mingrong in 1891, while Wangdao is his courtesy name. Beginning in 1915, he studied at Waseda University, Toyo University and Chuo University successively. He eventually obtained his Bachelor of Laws at Chuo University. The experience in Japan brought him into contact with communist ideas.

Chen returned to China as the May Fourth Movement began. He found a job teaching Chinese literature at then Chekiang Provincial No.1 Normal School. Meantime, Chen spread the New Culture with colleagues whose passions coincided with his own. The authority decided to dismiss them for that method. Despite students' agitation against the order, he was obliged to return to his hometown in 1920.

Thereafter, he assented to the request of Dai Jitao to translate the Communist Manifesto. Dai provided a translation in Japanese. Besides, Li Dazhao also provided its English version.

Later, he set up a group on the communist campaign in Shanghai, together with Chen Duxiu, Li Hanjun et al. He became a member of the CPC, after it was established in 1921. He was at odds with Chen Duxiu soon. Thus, he left the party in 1922. He rejoined the party in 1957.

References 

Translators to Chinese
1891 births
1977 deaths
Chuo University alumni
Academic staff of Fudan University
Presidents of Fudan University
Writers from Jinhua
Educators from Jinhua
Academic staff of Shanghai University (ROC)
Academic staff of Anhui University
Academic staff of Guangxi University
People's Republic of China translators
20th-century Chinese translators
Burials in Shanghai
People from Yiwu